, the true identity of the gentleman thief , is a fictional character and the main protagonist of the Magic Kaito manga series created by Gosho Aoyama. His father Toichi Kuroba was the original Kaito Kid before being killed by an unknown organization, while his mother was a former phantom thief known as the Phantom Lady. Kaito Kuroba then takes on the role of Kid after learning the organization is after a gemstone called Pandora and decides to find and destroy it.

Kaito Kuroba has also made significant appearances in Aoyama's Case Closed series. His strong resemblance to the protagonist of this series, Shinichi Kudo, allows Kaito to impersonate him without a mask. He is also voiced by the same voice actors as Shinichi. When Case Closed was localized into English, Viz Media chose the rōmaji Kaito Kid for the manga, while in the anime, Funimation Entertainment refer to him as Phantom Thief Kid, and Discotek Media and Macias Group refer to him as Kid the Phantom Thief. Shogakukan Asia also chose to use Kaito Kid.

Appearances

In the Magic Kaito manga series
Kaito Kuroba is a seventeen-year-old high school student who is an adept magician due to the influence of his father, Toichi Kuroba. Eight years prior to the series, Toichi had mysteriously died and was also the last time the Kaito Kid was spotted. In the present time, Kaito discovers a secret room in his home that was set up by his father to reveal itself on that very day. Finding the Kaito Kid's gadgets and costume in the room, Kaito dons the disguise and decides to confront Kid who has recently resurfaced after his eight years of absence. Kaito discovers Kid to be Konosuke Jii, his father's butler, who ascertains Toichi was the first Kaito Kid. Jii reveals his took on the role as Kid to lure out Toichi's murderer. Upon learning that his father was murdered, Kaito continues the role of the Kaito Kid as he searches for his father's killer.

As the Kaito Kid, Kaito uses his skills of perfect disguise and the gadgets his father left him to complete his heists. The most prominent of those gadgets are his cape which transforms into a hang-glider, a gun that shoots sharp metallic playing cards, and smoke bombs. To lure out the murderers, Kaito adopts a tradition of sending a note of his intending theft to the location beforehand. After a successful heist, Kaito returns the stolen treasures. As the Kaito Kid, Kaito eventually meets the organization who killed his father. He discovers they are searching for the gemstone called  which grants immortality if the water it emits during Volley's Comet is drank. Pandora is hidden in a larger gemstone and can only be seen if shone under the moonlight. Kaito decides to search for Pandora with the intention of destroying it and begins focusing his heists on large gemstones. As such, he begins the tradition of checking gemstones from his heists under the moonlight before returning them to their rightful owners.

In the Case Closed series
Kaito Kuroba, as the Kaito Kid, appears in Aoyama's manga series Case Closed as an rival and occasional ally to his rival, Conan. He is introduced as Kaito 1412, but is referred to as Kid later on. He is confronted by the protagonist of the series, Shinichi Kudo; teen detective turned child under the alias Conan Edogawa, who often foils his plans but Kid still eludes capture. Kaito also garners the attention of Jirokichi Suzuki who wants to capture Kid for fame. In the series, it is revealed that Shinichi's father Yusaku Kudo was the one who came up with the Kaito 1412 and Kaito Kid moniker. In the Case Closed film series, Kaito reveals he knows Conan is actually Shinichi. Due to Kaito's strong resemblance to Shinichi, he is able to disguise himself as Shinichi Kudo without a mask.

Kaito has made six appearances in the films. In Case Closed: The Last Wizard of the Century, he steals a fabergé egg to return to its rightful owner while helping Shinichi on his investigation for an assassin. In Case Closed: Magician of the Silver Sky, he continues his search for Pandora as Shinichi attempts to impede his heist. Kaito makes his third appearance in Case Closed: The Private Eyes' Requiem, where he indirectly helps Shinichi solve an old murder. His fourth appearance takes place in Case Closed: The Lost Ship in the Sky where Jirokichi baits him with a large gemstone on an airship as he attempts to capture him. He is also featured in Lupin the 3rd vs. Detective Conan: The Movie and Case Closed: Sunflowers of Inferno. In the latter, it's revealed that despite being a thief, Kid is a man of honor.

Reception
On a Case Closed character popularity poll, Kaito ranked as the top most popular character of the series. On an online poll by Conan Movie.jp, he placed second with 19% of the votes. John Sinnott from DVD Talk considers Kaito Kuroba as an interesting character as he was able to escape from Shinichi Kudo, the protagonist of Case Closed. Rebecca Silverman, writing for Anime News Network, has also described him as "interesting", noting that it "is a lot of fun" to see how he can defy Shinichi, and be a "foil figure" to him. SequentialTart.com's Amanda Tarbet remarks the Phantom Thief Kid to be an amusing character due to his gentlemanly manners and skills. Kaito Was Also in Poster as Cameo from Wallace & Gromit on the Game Boy Advance Cancelled Game.

References

Case Closed characters
Comics characters introduced in 1987
Fictional amateur detectives
Fictional characters with alter egos
Fictional gentleman thieves
Fictional impostors
Fictional Japanese people in anime and manga
Fictional stage magicians
Male characters in anime and manga
Teenage characters in anime and manga
Vigilante characters in comics